Jean Meeus (born 3 June 1905, date of death unknown) was a Belgian ice hockey player. He competed in the men's tournament at the 1928 Winter Olympics.

References

External links
 

1905 births
Year of death missing
Olympic ice hockey players of Belgium
Ice hockey players at the 1928 Winter Olympics
Place of birth missing
Belgian ice hockey left wingers
Sportspeople from Antwerp